Neolamprologus schreyeni is a species of cichlid endemic to Lake Tanganyika where it is only known from along the Burundi coast, inhabiting crevices. This species reaches a length of  TL.

References

schreyeni
Fish of Burundi
Freshwater fish of Africa
Fish described in 1974
Taxa named by Max Poll
Taxonomy articles created by Polbot